Morita therapy is a therapy developed by Shoma Morita. 

The goal of Morita therapy is to have the patient accept life as it is and places an emphasis on letting nature take its course. Morita therapy views feeling emotions as part of the laws of nature.

Morita therapy was originally developed to address shinkeishitsu, an outdated term used in Japan to describe patients who have various types of anxiety. Morita therapy was designed not to completely rid the patient of shinkeishitsu but to lessen the damaging effects.

While Morita therapy has been described as cognate to Albert Ellis's rational-emotive therapy. Morita therapy also has commonalities with existential and cognitive behavioral therapy.

Background
Shoma Morita (1874–1938) was a psychiatrist, researcher, philosopher, and academic department chair at Jikei University School of Medicine in Tokyo. Morita's training in Zen influenced his teachings, though Morita therapy is not a Zen practice.

Underlying philosophy

Morita therapy focuses on cultivating awareness and decentralizing the self. Aspects of mindfulness are contained in knowing what is controllable and what is not controllable, and seeing what is so without attachment to expectations. Feelings are acknowledged even when one does not act on them. The individual can focus on the full scope of the present moment and determine what needs to be done.

Morita therapy seeks to have patients learn to accept fluctuations of thoughts and feelings and ground their behavior in reality. Cure is not defined by the alleviation of discomfort (which the philosophy of this approach opposes), but by taking action in one's life to not be ruled by one's emotional state.

Morita's four stages

Morita is a four-stage process of therapy involving: 
 Absolute bed rest
 Occupational therapy (light)
 Occupational therapy (heavy)
 Complex activities

The first stage, seclusion and rest, lasts from four to seven days. The patient is ordered to stay on absolute bed rest, even to take meals, only rising to use the restroom. When the patient expresses boredom and wishes to rise and be productive, then they may move to the second stage.

During the second stage, patients are introduced to light and monotonous work that is conducted in silence. The second stage takes three to seven days. Patients may wash their face in the morning and evening, read aloud from the Kojiki, and write in a journal. In this phase, patients are also required to go outside, with a goal of a re-connection with nature. No strenuous physical work is allowed, such as climbing stairs and sweeping.

In the third stage, patients are allowed to engage in moderate physical work, but not social interaction. This stage lasts from three to seven days. For people with physical injuries, it is the phase where they move from passive treatment given to them by others (such as chiropractic, massage and pain medicine) to treating themselves through physical therapy. This third stage can become a part of daily life for some patients. The patient is encouraged to spend time in creating art, such as by writing, painting, or wood carving. The purpose of this stage is to instill confidence, empowerment, and patience through work. 

The fourth stage is the stage where patients are reintroduced into society. It can last from one to two weeks. The patient integrates meditation and physical activity. The patient may return to the previous stages and their teacher to find coping skills that will allow them to further recover.

Methods (Western)

Shoma Morita's work was first published in Japan in 1928. Morita Therapy Methods (MTM) adapted the therapy to modern western culture. For example, the original Morita treatment process has the patient spend their first week of treatment isolated in a room without any outside stimulation, which has been modified in MTM.

The shinkeishitsu concept has also been broadened to consider not just anxiety, but life situations in which modern westerners may find themselves, involving stress, pain and the aftermath of trauma. MTM is also designed to help patients deal with shyness.

As with Morita therapy proper, MTM is roughly divided into four basic areas of treatment.

Research
A Cochrane review conducted in 2015 assessed the effectiveness of Morita therapy for anxiety disorder in adults. The review states there is very low evidence available and it is not possible to draw a conclusion based on the included studies.

See also
David K. Reynolds
Naikan
Quiet sitting

References

Further reading

Morita, Shoma (1998) (Kondo, Akihisa, trans., LeVine, Peg, ed.) Morita Therapy and the True Nature of Anxiety-Based Disorders. State University of New York Press.
 Chang, SC. (1974). Morita Therapy. American Journal of Psychotherapy, 28: 208-221.
 Chang, SC. (2010). Psychotherapy and culture. Morita therapy: An illustration. World Cultural Psychiatry Research Review. December, 135-145.
 Deng Yuntian, Out of the quagmire of obsessive compulsive disorder 走出強迫症的泥潭.  A detailed book about Morita Therapy.
 Fujita, Chihiro. (1986). Morita Therapy: A Psychotherapeutic System for Neurosis. Tokyo: Igaku-Shoin.
 Ikeda, K. (1971). Morita's theory of neurosis and its application in Japanese psychotherapy. In J.G. Howell (Ed.), Modern Perspectives in World Psychiatry (519-530). New York: Brunner/Mazel.
 Ishiyama, Ishu. (1988). Current status of Morita therapy research: An overview of research methods, instruments, and results. International Bulletin of Morita Therapy. (1:2), November, 58-83.
 Ives, Christopher. (1992a). The teacher-student relationship in Japanese culture and Morita therapy. International Bulletin of Morita therapy. (5:1 & 2), 10-17.
 Kitanishi, Kenji. (2005). The philosophical background of Morita therapy: Its application to therapy. In Asian Culture and Psychotherapy: Implications for East and West. University of Hawai'i Press, p169-185).
 Kondo, Akihisa. (1953). Morita therapy: A Japanese therapy for neurosis. The American Journal of Psychoanalysis, (13:1), 31-37.
 Kondo, A. (1975). Morita therapy: It's Sociohistorical Context. In Arieti, Silvano and Chrzanowski, Gerard (1975). New Directions in Psychiatry: A Worldview.
 Kondo. A. (1983). Illusion and Human Suffering: A brief comparison of Horney's ideas with Buddhistic Understanding of mind. In Katz, Nathan (Ed), Buddhist and Western Psychology. Boulder: Prajna Press.
 Kora, Takehisa. (1965). Morita Therapy. International Journal of Psychiatry. (1:4), 611-640.
LeVine, Peg (2017). Classic Morita Therapy: Consciousness, Zen, Justice, Trauma. London: Routledge Press.
LeVine, P. (2016). Classic Morita therapy: Advancing consciousness in psychotherapy. Psychotherapy and Counselling Journal of Australia.
 LeVine, Peg (1991).  Morita psychotherapy: a theoretical overview for Australian consideration. Australian Psychologist, 26 (2), 103-107.
 LeVine, P. (1994). Impressions of Karen Horney's final lectures. Australian Psychologist. (29:1), 153-157.
 Ogawa, Brian (2007). A River to Live By: The 12 Life Principles of Morita Therapy, Xlibris/Random House.
 Ogawa, B. (2013). Desire For Life: The Practitioner's Introduction to Morita Therapy for the Treatment of Anxiety Disorders. XLibris Publ., Indiana

Psychotherapies
Zen